Dale Engstrom (April 15, 1917 – January 22, 2018) was an American businessman, United States Army officer and politician.

Engstrom went to the University of Wisconsin and graduated from the University of Maryland. He served in the United States Army from 1944 to 1961 during World War II and the Korean War. Engstrom was commissioned a lieutenant colonel. He retired from the army. He was in the insurance business and was the co-owner of an appliance parts warehouse in Chattanooga, Tennessee. Engstrom lived in Soddy, Tennessee. He served in the Tennessee House of Representatives in 1971 and 1972 and was a Republican. Engstrom died in Forest City, North Carolina.

Notes

1917 births
2018 deaths
People from Soddy-Daisy, Tennessee
Military personnel from Tennessee
University System of Maryland alumni
University of Wisconsin–Madison alumni
Businesspeople from Tennessee
Republican Party members of the Tennessee House of Representatives
American centenarians
Men centenarians
20th-century American businesspeople
United States Army personnel of World War II